Judah Loew ben Bezalel (between 1512 and 1526 – 17 September 1609), also known as Rabbi Loew ( Löw, Loewe, Löwe or Levai), the Maharal of Prague, or simply the Maharal (the Hebrew acronym of "Moreinu ha-Rav Loew", 'Our Teacher, Rabbi Loew'), was an important Talmudic scholar, Jewish mystic, mathematician, astronomer, and philosopher who, for most of his life, served as a leading rabbi in the cities of Mikulov in Moravia and Prague in Bohemia.

Loew wrote on Jewish philosophy and Jewish mysticism. His work Gur Aryeh al HaTorah is a supercommentary on Rashi's Torah commentary. He is also the subject of a later legend that he created the Golem of Prague, an animate being fashioned from clay.

Early life

Loew was probably born in Poznań, Poland,—though Perels lists the birth town mistakenly as Worms in the Holy Roman Empire—to Rabbi Bezalel (Loew), whose family originated from the Rhenish town of Worms. Perels claimed that his grandfather Chajim of Worms was the grandson of Judah Leib the Elder and thus a claimant to the Davidic line, through Sherira Gaon. However, modern scholars such as Otto Muneles have challenged this. Loew's birth year is uncertain, with different sources listing 1512, 1520 and 1526. His uncle Jakob ben Chajim was Reichsrabbiner ("Rabbi of the Empire") of the Holy Roman Empire, and his older brother Chaim of Friedberg was a famous rabbinical scholar and Rabbi of Worms and Friedberg. There is no documented evidence of his having received formal religious education, leading scholars to conclude that he was an extremely gifted autodidact.

His name

His name "Löw" or "Loew", derived from the German Löwe, "lion" (cf. the Yiddish Leib of the same origin), is a kinnui or substitute name for the Hebrew Judah or Yehuda, as this name—originally of the tribe of Judah—is traditionally associated with a lion. In the Book of Genesis, the patriarch Jacob refers to his son Judah as a Gur Aryeh, a "Young Lion" (Genesis 49:9) when blessing him. In Jewish naming tradition the Hebrew name and the substitute name are often combined as a pair, as in this case. The Loew's classic work on the Rashi commentary of the Torah is called the Gur Aryeh al HaTorah in Hebrew, meaning "Young Lion [commenting] upon the Torah".

Loew's tomb in Prague is decorated with a heraldic shield with a lion with two intertwined tails (queue fourchee), alluding both to his first name and to Bohemia, the arms of which has a two-tailed lion.

Career
He accepted a rabbinical position in 1553 as Landesrabbiner of Moravia at Mikulov (Nikolsburg), directing community affairs but also determining which tractate of the Talmud was to be studied in the communities in that province. He also revised the community statutes on the election and taxation process. Although he retired from Moravia in 1588 at age 68, the communities still considered him an authority long after that.

One of his activities in Moravia was the rallying against slanderous slurs on legitimacy (Nadler) that were spread in the community against certain families and could ruin the finding of a marriage partner for the children of those families. This phenomenon even affected his own family. He used one of the two yearly grand sermons (between Rosh Hashanah and Yom Kippur 1583) to denounce the phenomenon.

He moved back to Prague in 1588, where he again accepted a rabbinical position, replacing the retired Isaac Hayoth. He immediately reiterated his views on Nadler. On 23 February 1592, he had an audience with Emperor Rudolf II, which he attended together with his brother Sinai and his son-in-law Isaac Cohen; Prince Bertier was present with the emperor. The conversation seems to have been related to Kabbalah (Jewish mysticism, Hebrew: קַבָּלָה) a subject which held much fascination for the emperor.

In 1592, Loew moved to Poznań, where he had been elected as Chief Rabbi of Poland. In Poznań he composed Netivoth Olam and part of Derech Chaim (see below).

Loew's brother, Chaim ben Betzalel, authored a legal work Vikuach Mayim Chaim which challenged the rulings of Crakow legalist, Moshe Isserles.

Influence

Disciples
It is unknown how many Talmudic rabbinical scholars Loew taught in Moravia, but the main disciples from the Prague period include Rabbis Yom-Tov Lipmann Heller and David Gans. The former promoted his teacher's program of regular Mishnah study by the masses, and composed his Tosefoth Yom Tov (a Mishnah commentary incorporated into almost all published editions of the Mishnah over the past few hundred years) with this goal in mind. David Ganz wrote Tzemach David, a work of Jewish and general history, as well as writing on astronomy; both Loew and Ganz were in contact with Tycho Brahe, the famous astronomer.

Loew's numerous philosophical works have become cornerstones of Jewish thought;

Personal life
His family consisted of his wife, Pearl, six daughters, and a son, Bezalel, who became a rabbi in Kolín, but died early in 1600.
He was independently wealthy.

His elder brother was Hayim ben Bezalel.

Death
Towards the end of his life he moved back to Prague, where he died in 1609.
Loew is buried at the Old Jewish Cemetery, Prague in Josefov, where his grave and tombstone are intact.

Legend of the golem

Loew is the subject of the legend about the creation of a golem, a creature made out of clay to defend the Jews of the Prague Ghetto from antisemitic attacks, particularly the blood libel. He is said to have used mystical powers based on the esoteric knowledge of how God created Adam. The general view of historians and critics is that the legend is a German literary invention of the early 19th century. The earliest known source for the story thus far is the 1834 book Der Jüdische Gil Blas by Friedrich Korn. It has been repeated and adapted many times since.

Works

He began publishing his books at a very late age. In 1578, at the age of 66, he published his first book, Gur Aryeh ("Young Lion", Prague 1578) - an supercommentary in five volumes for Rashi's commentary on the Torah, which goes well beyond that, and four years later he published his book Gevuroth HaShem ("God's Might[y Acts]", Cracow 1582) anonymously.

Gur Aryeh ("Young Lion", Prague 1578), a supercommentary on Rashi's Pentateuch commentary
Gevuroth Hashem ("God's Mighty Acts", Cracow 1582), for the holiday of Passover - On the Exodus and the Miracles.
Derech Chaim ("Way of Life", Cracow 1589), a commentary on the Mishnah tractate Avoth
Derashot ("Sermons", Prague 1589 and 1593), collected edition by Haim Pardes, Tel Aviv 1996.
Netivoth Olam ("Pathways of the World", Prague 1595-1596), a work of ethics
Be'er ha-Golah ("The Well of Exile", Prague 1598), an explanatory work on the Talmudic and Midrashic Aggadah, mainly responding to interpretations by the Italian scholar Azariah dei Rossi (Azariah min ha-Adumim)
Netzach Yisrael ("The Eternity of Israel", Prague 1599; Netzach "eternity", has the same root as the word for victory), on Tisha B'Av (an annual day of mourning about the destruction of the Temples and the Jewish exile) and the final deliverance
Tif'ereth Yisrael ("The Glory of Israel", Venice 1599), philosophical exposition on the Torah, intended for the holiday of Shavuot
Or Chadash ("A New Light", Prague 1600), on Purim
Ner Mitzvah ("The Candle of the Commandment", Prague 1600), on Hanukkah
Chiddushei Aggadot ("Novellae on the Aggada", the narrative portions of the Talmud), discovered in the 20th century
Divrei Negidim ("Words of Rectors"), a commentary on the Seder of Pesach, published by a descendant
Chiddushim al Ha-Shas, a commentary on Talmud, recently published for the first time from a manuscript by Machon Yerushalayim on Bava Metzia; Shabbos, and Eruvin; others may be forthcoming.
Various other works, such as his responsa and works on the Jewish Sabbath and the holidays of Sukkot, Rosh Hashana and Yom Kippur, have not been preserved.

His works on the holidays bear titles that were inspired by the Biblical verse in I Chronicles 29:11: "Yours, O Lord, are the greatness, and the might, and the glory, and the victory, and the majesty, for all that is in the heavens and on the earth [is Yours]; Yours is the kingdom and [You are He] Who is exalted over everything as the Leader." The book of "greatness" (gedula) on the Sabbath was not preserved, but the book of "power" (gevurah) is Gevurath Hashem, the book of glory (tif'arah) is Tif'ereth Yisrael, and the book of "eternity" or "victory" (netzach) is Netzach Yisrael.

Commemoration
In April 1997, Czech Republic and Israel jointly issued a set of stamps, one of which featured the tombstone of Loew. In May 2009, the Czech Post issued a stamp commemorating the 400th anniversary of Loew's death. In June 2009 the Czech Mint issued a commemorative coin marking the same milestone.

See also

Kerem Maharal, a moshav in northern Israel named in his honour
André Neher
Statue of Judah Loew ben Bezalel, Prague

References

Further reading
Byron L. Sherwin, Mystical Theology and Social Dissent: The Life and Works of Judah Loew of Prague (Fairleigh Dickinson University Press, 1982)
Rivka Schatz Uffenheimer, "Maharal's Conception of Law- Antithesis to Natural Law" Jewish Law Annual Vol. VI.
Rivka Schatz Uffenheimer, "Existence and Eschatology in the Teachings of the Maharal" Immanuel 14 (Spring 1982) 66–97; Immanuel 15 (Winter 1982-3) 62–72.
Moshe Zuriel "Numbers: Their meaning and Symbolism According to Maharal" [Hebrew] HaMaayan 18:3 (1978) 14–23; 18:4 (1978) 30–41, reprinted in Sefer Ozrot Gedolei Yisroel (Jerusalem:2000) volume 1, pp. 204–228.
Martin Buber, "The Beginning of the National Idea" On Zion: The History of an Idea. (New York, Schocken Books, 1973).
Otto Dov Kulka, "The Historical Background of the National and Educational Teachings of the Maharal of Prague" [Hebrew] Zion 50 (1985) 277–320.
Benjamin Gross, Netzah Yisrael (Tel Aviv: Devir, 1974)
Mordechai Breuer, "The Maharal of Prague's Disputation with Christians: A Reappraisal of Be'er Ha-Golah" in Tarbiẕ (1986) 253-260
Adlerstein Y. Be'er Hagolah: The Classic Defense of Rabbinic Judaism Through the Profundity of the Aggadah. New York, NY: Mesorah Publications, 2000. .
Aharon Kleinberger, The Educational Theory of the Maharal of Prague [Hebrew] (Magnes: 1962).
Andre Neher, Jewish Thought and the Scientific Revolution: David Gans (1541–1613) and his times (Oxford-New York: Littman Library, 1986)
Neher, Faust et le Maharal de Prague: le Mythe et le Reel (Paris: Presses Universitaires de France, 1987);
Neher, Le Puits de l'Exil: la Theologie Dialectique du Maharal de Prague (Paris: A. Michel, 1996)
Neher, Mishnato shel ha-Maharal mi-Prague, Reʾuven Mass, c2003.
Gross, Benjamin, Yehi Or (Reʾuven Mass, 1995).
Gross, Benjamin, Netsah Yiśraʾel Tel Aviv : Devir, 1974.
Eliyahu Yaakov Deutsch, Shabbos Insights Of The Maharal Jerusalem: Targum, 2009.

External links
YIVO Encyclopedia - Yehudah Leib ben Betsalel

Yehuda Loew — The Maharal jewishvirtuallibrary.org
Family tree
Shiurim on Derech Chaim at Torah.org

Resources
Tiferet Yisrael, Hebrew full text

1609 deaths
16th-century births
16th-century Bohemian rabbis
16th-century Polish rabbis
Czech folklore
Czech Orthodox rabbis
Czech people of Polish-Jewish descent
Golem
Jewish folklore
Kabbalists
Jewish philosophers
Clergy from Poznań
Philosophers of Judaism
Rabbis from Nikolsburg
Rabbis of Prague
Davidic line
17th-century Polish rabbis
Exponents of Jewish law